The Indiana Pacers are a professional basketball team based in Indianapolis, Indiana, United States. They are members of the Central Division of the Eastern Conference in the National Basketball Association (NBA). The Pacers were founded in 1967, originally as members of the American Basketball Association, where they were crowned league champions three times and made the playoffs in all of the nine seasons they participated in the league. The Pacers were led during the ABA days by two-time MVP Mel Daniels and by head coach Bobby Leonard.

The 1976–77 season marked the first season of NBA play for the Pacers and the team struggled early, compared to their ABA success. The Pacers only made it to the NBA playoffs three times in their first 13 seasons. The Pacers would not win their first playoff series until the 1993–94 season, which came against the Orlando Magic. It was during this time that the Pacers were led by 1987 draft pick, Reggie Miller, who entered the Basketball Hall of Fame in 2012. Miller would play for the Pacers until the 2005 season and with his help, the Pacers would go on to win one Eastern Conference championship, four Central Division championships, and make 15 playoff appearances.

Over the Pacers' 53 seasons of play they have made the playoffs 36 times (27 in the NBA and 9 in the ABA). The Pacers have appeared in the NBA Eastern Conference Finals eight times (1994, 1995, 1998, 1999, 2000, 2004, 2013, 2014)  The Pacers are one of 11 franchises to have never won an NBA championship and the only Central Division team without at least one title.

Table key

Seasons

All-time records

Notes

References

 
seasons